2099 (MMXCIX)  is a year in the 2090s decade

2099 may also refer to
 The year 2099 BC in the 21st century BC
 2099 (number), the number 
 2099 Öpik, a Mars-crosser asteroid
 2099 series, 1999-2000 books by British writer John Peel 
 2099: World of Tomorrow, a comic book series
 Space: 2099, proposed remake of TV series Space: 1999
 "2099", a song by Charli XCX featuring Troye Sivan from Charli (2019)

See also
Marvel 2099, comics imprint